Iss Jungle Se Mujhe Bachao premiered on 13 July 2009 on Sony Entertainment Television (India). It was the first and only Indian series based on British reality game show I'm a Celebrity...Get Me Out of Here!. The winner of the show was Mona Wasu, who earned prize money of 10 million INR.

Concept
The show is licensed from ITV's format, I'm a Celebrity...Get Me out of Here!. The basic concept is the same, where a group of celebrities have to survive in a jungle camp without any amenities, and must compete with each other to stay on in the show.

Every contestant gets a handful of rice and some soybean or lentils for food every three days, which is clearly not enough for survival. Therefore, they must participate in various physically challenging contests and win "food credits" for themselves and their team members. Each day, the team must nominate one participant to play in the day's contest and be the bread-winner for that day.

At the end of every week, the contestant with the fewest public votes and the contestant with the most elimination nominations from the participants face off in an elimination task called the "Maha Jungle Challenge". The winner of this challenge gets to stay back while the loser is eliminated from the game.

The audience can vote for their favorite participants via phone calls or SMS.

Series overview

Season 1

Ten Indian celebrities were chosen to participate in the only season. They were flown to Taman Negara in the rain-forests of Malaysia, where they had to stay in the jungle in an outdoor camp with little or no luxury amenities. Every contestant was allowed to carry any two luxury items of their choice, which they had to specify before the contest began. The ten celebrities were often divided into different sub-groups and made to compete among themselves every week.

Celebrities
Some more celebrities were introduced in later episodes as the original celebrities started getting eliminated.

The 10 original contestants were: 
Mona Wasu (winner) – Indian television actress.
Chetan Hansraj (1st runner up) – Indian television actor.
Anaida (2nd runner up) – 90's Pop icon
Akashdeep Saigal – Indian Television actor.
Aman Verma – Indian film and television actor
Marc Robinson – Fashion director and grooming expert
Shweta Tiwari (Quit) – Television actress and reality TV star
Ishq Bector – Singer
Palak Johal – Roadies fame
Fiza Mohammad – Former wife of politician Chander Mohan.

The 5 wildcards were: 
Negar Khan – Model
Jay Bhanushali – Indian television and film actor
Mika Singh – Popular singer
Chitrashi Rawat – Indian actress
Kashmera Shah – Film actress

Elimination table
Each week the audience votes to save their favourite celebrity to stay in the jungle. The celebrities with the lowest votes face each other off in the "Maha Jungle Challenge" after which the loser is evicted from the jungle.

References

External links
 Official Sony TV website for Iss Jungle Se Mujhe Bachao
 

Indian reality television series
2009 Indian television series debuts
2009 Indian television series endings
Sony Entertainment Television original programming
India